Haroli Assembly constituency is one of the 68 constituencies in the Himachal Pradesh Legislative Assembly of Himachal Pradesh a northern state of India. Haroli is also part of Hamirpur, Himachal Pradesh Lok Sabha constituency.

Member of Legislative Assembly

Election candidates

2022

Election results

2017

See also
 Haroli
 Una district
 List of constituencies of Himachal Pradesh Legislative Assembly

References

External links
 

Assembly constituencies of Himachal Pradesh
Una district